John David Wile (born 9 March 1947) is an English former footballer and manager.

Wile played as a central defender for Sunderland, although he did not play a Football League match for them. In 1967–68 he signed for Peterborough United, having had a trial there first. He made 130 senior appearances for The Posh between 1967 and 1970.

Wile then joined West Bromwich Albion in December 1970. He spent more than 12 years at Albion, and was club captain during and after Ron Atkinsons spell as manager. Wile made a total of 619 senior appearances for Albion.

His most famous moment came when he played with blood pouring from a headwound during the 1978 FA Cup semi-final against Ipswich at Highbury. After leaving Albion in June 1983, Wile returned to Peterborough as player-manager after missing out on a similar post at Bolton Wanderers a year earlier. He later returned to West Bromwich as managing director, a position he occupied from 1997 through to 2002.

In 2004, he was named as one of West Bromwich Albion's 16 greatest players, in a poll organised as part of the club's 125th anniversary celebrations.

References

1947 births
Living people
Footballers from County Durham
English footballers
English football managers
Sunderland A.F.C. players
Peterborough United F.C. players
West Bromwich Albion F.C. players
Vancouver Whitecaps (1974–1984) players
North American Soccer League (1968–1984) players
West Bromwich Albion F.C. managers
Peterborough United F.C. managers
West Bromwich Albion F.C. non-playing staff
Association football defenders
Association football player-managers
English expatriate sportspeople in Canada
Expatriate soccer players in Canada
English expatriate footballers